Empresa Metropolitana de Servicios y Administración del Transporte or EMSAT (Metropolitan Transport Services and Administration Company) is the transportation government agency of the municipality of Quito, the capital of Ecuador.

Origins
Formerly known as the UPGT (Transportation Planning and Management Unit), after requests from the mayor of Quito, the Metropolitan Council decided to change its name to the Metropolitan Transport Services and Administration (EMSAT), a joint venture, mostly formed through public funds and an intention to be autonomous in its financial management. With the passing of time this company was managed by Mr. Rodrigo Torres who had to leave the administration of this company due to alleged cases of corruption when managing the management of the "Ecovia". Its Director of Operations, Mr. Bolivar Muñoz, has expressed his effort and sacrifice in favor of the development of this former company of the Municipality.

Operations
Its function is to manage the bus system in and around the city. Quito's main bus system is known as MetrobusQ.

See also

List of bus companies

References

External links
quito.gov.ec, official website of municipality of Quito, Ecuador (in Spanish)

Bus transport in Ecuador
Transport in Quito
Municipally owned companies
Public transport in Ecuador
Transport authorities in Ecuador